The Big Day, initially known as A Simple Wedding, is a 2018 Singaporean romance comedy film directed by Lee Thean-jeen.

Plot
An Shuyu imagnines that her wedding with Xu Nuoyan will be simple. However, their wedding is interrupted by various things, such as overbearing in-laws and a jealous best friend.

Cast
 Desmond Tan as Xu Nuoyan
 Amber An as An Shuyu
 Michael Huang as Bawa
 Richard Low as Ah Guan
 Liu Ling Ling as Ah Mei
  as Jojo
 Hirzi Zulkiflie as Wira
 Afdlin Shauki as Inspector Rashid

Release
The film released in theatres in Singapore on 21 June 2018.

Reception
Liao Wanqi of zbCOMMA rated the film 3.5 stars out of 5. Ang Tian Tian of The New Paper rated the film 3 stars out of 5, praising the chemistry between the two main characters, the performance of An, and the editing style. John Lui of The Straits Times rated the film 2.5 stars out of 5, writing "To Lee's credit, there are a couple of interludes that come from character, such as ones that reveal the affection the couple have for each other. The trouble is that as characters, the couple are as sanitised and blandly likeable as tap water and all the wackiness coming from the supporting players cannot make up for the absence of texture." Chen Yunhong of Lianhe Zaobao rated the film 2.5 stars out of 5 for entertainment and 2 stars out of 5 for art. Douglas Tseng of today rated the film 2 stars out of 5.

References

External links
 

2018 films
Singaporean romantic comedy films